Francis D. Case (born August 14, 1958) is a former American football defensive end in the National Football League who played for the Kansas City Chiefs. He played college football at Penn State University.

References 

Penn State Nittany Lions football players
American football defensive ends
Kansas City Chiefs players
1958 births
Living people